The 1992–93 Tulane Green Wave men's basketball team represented Tulane University in the 1992–93 college basketball season. This was head coach Perry Clark's fourth season at Tulane. The Green Wave competed in the Metro Conference and played their home games at Devlin Fieldhouse. They finished the season 22–9 (9–3 in Metro play) and finished second in the conference regular season standings. Tulane lost in the quarterfinal round of the Metro Conference tournament, but received an at-large bid to the 1993 NCAA tournament. The Green Wave defeated Kansas State in the opening round before losing to Florida State in the round of 32.

Roster

Schedule and results

|-
!colspan=9 style=| Regular season

|-
!colspan=9 style=| Metro Conference tournament

|-
!colspan=9 style=| NCAA tournament

Rankings

References

Tulane
Tulane Green Wave men's basketball seasons
Tulane
Tulane
Tulane